Leucanthiza is a genus of moths in the family Gracillariidae.

Species
Leucanthiza amphicarpeaefoliella Clemens, 1859
Leucanthiza dircella Braun, 1914
Leucanthiza forbesi Bourquin, 1962

External links
Global Taxonomic Database of Gracillariidae (Lepidoptera)

Lithocolletinae
Gracillarioidea genera

Taxa named by James Brackenridge Clemens